Hans Fischer (29 January 1961 –13 December 1988) was a Brazilian cyclist. He competed at the 1980 Summer Olympics and 1984 Summer Olympics.

Biography 
Fischer was born in Pomerode, Santa Catarina. He began pedaling at the age of five on an adult bike, regularly practicing in 1976 on medical advice after suffering a fall from the horse and fractured his knee.

He participated in the 1979 Pan American Junior Championship in Venezuela, where he won two gold medals, one silver and one bronze. He also participated in two editions of the Olympic Games: from Moscow in 1980, and from Los Angeles in 1984.

He died in 1988, from a cardiac arrest, at the age of 26.

References

External links
 
 Santa Catarina 24 horas - Museu Pomerano lança exposição temporária do acervo dos irmãos ciclistas Hans e Edson Fischer

1961 births
1988 deaths
Sportspeople from Santa Catarina (state)
Brazilian male cyclists
Brazilian road racing cyclists
Brazilian people of German descent
Olympic cyclists of Brazil
Cyclists at the 1980 Summer Olympics
Cyclists at the 1984 Summer Olympics
20th-century Brazilian people